Brian Merriman or in Irish Brian Mac Giolla Meidhre (c. 1747 – 27 July 1805) was an Irish language bard, farmer, and hedge school teacher from rural County Clare. His single surviving work of substance, the 1000-line long  Dream vision poem  (The Midnight Court), describes a supernatural trial in which the women of Ireland are suing the men for refusing to marry and father children and is often compared to the works of François Rabelais. Cúirt an Mheán Oíche is widely regarded as the greatest work of comic or satirical verse in the history of Irish poetry.

Merriman's life
Merriman in oral accounts collected after his death was said to have been born illegitimately in Clondagad or Ennistymon, County Clare. His father is said to have been either a Roman Catholic priest or an Anglo-Irish landlord. His mother was surnamed Quilkeen.

Shortly after his birth, Merriman's mother married a stonemason who was working on the walls of the Deerpark estate in Ennistymon. The family moved to Feakle and some years later Merriman is known to have owned a 20-acre (81,000 m2) farm near Loch Gréine.

According to Daniel Corkery, it is still unknown, "how nor where", Brian Merriman, "got his education. Perhaps in some hedge school, or intermittently at the feet of some wandering poet or priest, one bearing with him the relics of a nation's culture, the other the credentials of Louvain or Salamanca."

Merriman is known, however, to have been the teacher of the illegal hedge school for the townland of Kilclaren. He is also said in the local oral tradition to have been a stout man with black hair who was a very talented fiddler.

Also according to the local oral tradition, Brian Merriman was employed for a time as resident tutor to the children of a local Protestant and Anglo-Irish landlord.

According to Daniel Corkery, this would not have been uncommon at the time. The Irish language was still spoken so pervasively in 18th century Ireland that many landlords and their families had to learn Irish to communicate with their household servants, tenant farmers, and hired labourers. Furthermore, the oral poetry composed in Munster Irish throughout the 18th century, which is replete with allusions to both Classical and Irish mythology, includes many of the greatest and most immortal works of Irish literature in the Irish language.

It is unlikely, however, that Merriman's employers were aware of this fact or of their resident tutor's enormous significance to Modern literature in Irish. As Daniel Corkery further writes, "The first article in an Ascendancy's creed is that the natives are a lesser breed and that anything that is theirs (except their land and their gold!) is therefore of little value. If they have had a language and a literature, it cannot have been a civilised language, cannot have been anything but a patois used by the hillmen among themselves; and as for their literature, the less said about it the better."

According to the local oral tradition, however, Merriman was inspired to compose Cúirt an Mheán Oíche after having a nightmare while sleeping along the shores of Loch Gréine. According to other accounts, Merriman composed the poem while recovering from a leg injury that left him unable to work. As is the tradition in Irish culture, Merriman taught his poem to the local seanchaithe, who memorised it and passed it down generation after generation.

According to Frank O'Connor, Brian Merriman "was a fine poet" and was every bit the equal of his contemporaries Jonathan Swift, Oliver Goldsmith, and Robert Burns.

According to Seán Ó Tuama, "The Midnight Court is undoubtedly one of the greatest comic works of literature, and certainly the greatest comic poem ever written in Ireland. … It is a poem of gargantuan energy, moving clearly and pulsatingly along a simple story line, with a middle, a beginning and an end. For a poem of over one thousand lines it has few longeurs. It is full of tumultuous bouts of great good humour, verbal dexterity and rabelesian ribaldry. It is a mammoth readable achievement with little need of gloss."

According to William Butler Yeats, "Had Mac Giolla Meidhre before his mind the fires of Saint John's Night, for all through Munster men and women leaped the fires that they might be fruitful, and after scattered the ashes that the fields might be fruitful also? Certainly it is not possible to read his verses without being shocked and horrified as city onlookers were perhaps shocked and horrified at the free speech and buffoonery of some traditional country festival. He wrote at a moment of national discouragement: the Penal Laws were still in force though weakening, the old order was a vivid memory, but, with the failure of the last Jacobite rising, hope of its return had vanished, and no new political dream had come."

Merriman married around 1787 and had two daughters. In 1797, the Royal Dublin Society awarded him two prizes for his flax crop.

Around 1800 he moved to Limerick City. According to the oral tradition, Merriman moved his family because he feared that his prosperous farm in Feakle might cause local men to abduct his two beautiful daughters and force them into marriage. In Limerick, Merriman continued to teach.

Brian Merriman died on Saturday 27 July 1805. His death was recorded two days later in the General Advertiser and Limerick Gazette: "Died – on Saturday morning, in Old Clare-street, after a few days' illness, Mr Bryan Merryman, teacher of Mathematics, etc." Frank O'Connor has alleged, incorrectly, that  "Irish literature in the Irish language may be said to have died with him."

Yeats, on the other hand, wrote, "Standish Hayes O'Grady has described The Midnight Court as the best poem written in Gaelic, and as I read Mr. Ussher's translation I have felt, without sharing what seems to me an extravagant opinion, that Mac Giolla Meidhre, had political circumstances been different, might have founded a modern Gaelic literature."

Brian Merriman lies buried in Feakle graveyard.

Cúirt an Mheán Oíche

In the opening section of the poem, the poet declares his love for walking alone in the countryside of County Clare, which he describes lyrically. After walking past a red fox being pursued by hunters on horseback, the poet walks to the shore of Loch Gréine and lays down to take a nap in a ditch. Then, a hideous giantess appears, who carries a staff to which a bailiff's warrant has been nailed. The giantess wakes up the poet, scolds him for sleeping in a ditch while court is in session, and drags him kicking and screaming into the presence of Aoibheal, the Queen of all the Fairies in County Clare. 

On the way to the ruined church at Moynoe, the giantess explains that the Queen is disgusted by the destruction of the clan system, the Flight of the Wild Geese, the exile or outlawry of the Clan Chiefs, and their replacement by lowborn but greedy Protestant and Anglo-Irish landlords, "who pick the bones of the Irish clean." Furthermore, the Queen is also horrified by how the judges invariably twist English Law to always support the new Protestant Ascendancy. The giantess further explains that Aoibheal is even more concerned that Ireland's men are refusing to marry and father children and that if something is not done, the Irish people will face extinction. Therefore, the Queen is taking the implementation of justice upon herself. When the giant and the Bard arrive at the ruined church, there follows a traditional court case under the Brehon law form of a two-part debate followed by the judge's ruling.

In the first part, a young woman declares her case against the young men of Ireland for their refusal to marry. She complains that despite increasingly desperate flirtation at hurling matches, wakes, and pattern days, the young men insist on ignoring her in favour of late marriages to richer, older, uglier, and often extremely shrewish women. The young woman describes at length her use of pishogues, Satanism, and black magic, which have also failed to gain her a husband. The young woman then bewails the contempt with which she is treated by the married women of the village.

She is answered by an old man who first denounces the wanton promiscuity of young women in general, suggesting that the young woman who spoke before was conceived by a Tinker in a ditch. He vividly describes the infidelity of his own young wife. He declares his humiliation at finding her already pregnant on their wedding night and the gossip which has surrounded the "premature" birth of "his" son ever since. Then, however, the old man declares that there is nothing wrong with his wife's illegitimate children and denounces marriage as "out of date." He demands that the Queen outlaw it altogether and replace it with a system of free love.

The young woman, however, is infuriated by the old' man's words and is barely restrained from physically assaulting him.

The young woman explains that the old man's wife was a homeless beggar who married him to avoid starvation. She graphically describes the many, many attempts that the old man's wife made to consummate the marriage, only to find her elderly husband impotent. She tells the old man that if his wife has taken a lover, she well deserves one. The young woman then calls for the abolition of priestly celibacy, alleging that priests would otherwise make wonderful husbands and fathers. She declares that many lonely women are already being "consoled" by priests, who are regularly fathering children under other men's names. In conclusion, the young woman declares that she will keep trying to attract an older man in hopes that her unmarried humiliation will finally end.

Finally, in the judgement section, Queen Aoibheal announces that there is nothing wrong with marriage and that she admires men who work hard every day to provide for their families. She, therefore, rules that all laymen must marry before the age of 21, on pain of flogging at the hands of Ireland's women. She advises the women to equally target the romantically indifferent, homosexuals, and male seducers who boast of the numbers of single and married women whose lives they have ruined. Aoibheal tells the women to be careful, however, not to flog any man until he is unable to father children. She also states that abolishing priestly celibacy is beyond her mandate. She expresses a belief, however, that the Pope will soon allow priests to openly act on their carnal urges and counsels patience until then.

To the poet's horror, the young woman angrily points him out as a 30-year-old bachelor and describes her many failed attempts to become his wife. She declares that, despite the poet's crooked back and extreme ugliness, none of that would matter in the bedroom. She therefore demands that Merriman must be the first man to suffer the consequences of the new marriage law. As a crowd of infuriated single women gleefully prepares to flog Brian Merriman into a quivering bowl of jelly, he awakens along the shore of Loch Gréine to find it was all a terrible nightmare.

Influence

Language and metre
The language of Merriman's poem is a mixture of the Classical Gaelic literary language of the Bards with everyday Munster Irish, the vernacular of rural County Clare during the late 18th century. The meter is the rarely used Dactylic Trimeter followed by a single Trochaic foot. The end rhymes are all feminine.

In a 1926 preface to Arland Ussher's translation, William Butler Yeats wrote, "Brian Mac Giolla Meidhre – or to put it in English, Brian Merriman – wrote in Gaelic, one final and three internal rhymes, pouring all his mediaeval abundance into that narrow neck."

The Poetic Courts
According to Daniel Corkery, in 18th century Munster, a custom similar to the Welsh Eisteddfod existed. In what was also both mimicry and satire of the ceremonial of the English-dominated legal and court system, the Chief-Bard of a district would preside over sessions of a Cúirt, or Poetic Court. Like the trial in Merriman's poem, a Munster Cúirt would begin with "bailiffs" delivering often humorously worded "warrants" which summoned local Irish-language poets to a Bardic competition presided over by the Chief-Bard as "judge". In many cases, two Irish-language poets at the Cúirt would engage in Flyting; a mixture of debate poetry and the improvised trading of insults in verse, much like that between the two lawyers in Merriman's poem. Also according to Corkery, much of the serious, improvised, and comic poetry in the Irish-language composed for sessions of the Munster Poetic Courts was written down by the Court "Recorders" and still survives.

Satire of Jacobite poetry

The poem begins by using the conventions of the Jacobite Aisling, or Dream vision poem, in which the poet is out walking when he has a vision of a beautiful woman from the Otherworld. Typically, this woman is Ireland. She will lament her lot and/or call upon her 'sons' to rise up against both the anti-Catholicism and the tyranny of the Whig oligarchy. The woman will end by prophesying the return of religious toleration for Catholics and the dispossession of the Anglo-Irish landlords when the heir from the House of Stuart regains the British and Irish thrones.

According to Ciarán Carson, "Merriman subverted all that. His fairy woman is not beautiful, but a threatening monster. The vision that she discloses is not of a future paradise, but a present reality. Merriman's poem, for all its rhetorical and satirical extravagance, gives us a real sense of what life must have been like in 18th century Ireland: its people and their speech, their gestures, their dress, their food and drink, their recreations, and, of course, their sexual mores. The atmosphere of the 'court' is not so much that of a court of law, but of a country market, filled with verbal commotion and colour. For all that, it is still a dream-world, where Merriman can free himself from the restraints of conventional discourse, swooping from high rhetoric to street-talk in the space of a few lines – much as Dante did in the Inferno, which is also an aisling. And language is very much a concern of the aisling: a recurrent theme is the poet's lament for the decline of Irish, and its support mechanism of noble patronage."

Satire of religion
Ciarán Carson writes that the Old Man's praise of illegitimacy before the Court bolsters the oral tradition of County Clare, which alleges that Brian Merriman was born out of wedlock. Carson also writes that some people believe Merriman may have been aware of the similar sentiments expressed in the 1728 poem The Bastard by Richard Savage.

While Yeats points out the plot similarities between The Midnight Court and Jonathan Swift's Cadenus and Vanessa, he also expresses a belief that Merriman was mainly inspired by Irish folklore and mythology, particularly the love stories told about the demigods Cuchulain and Diarmuid Ua Duibhne and anti-Christian debate poetry such as the, "old dialogues where Oisín railed at Patrick." Yeats argued that Merriman's poem may be considered, "more than the last song of Irish Paganism," but as similar to other works of religious satire from the so-called Age of Reason, including Robert Burns' Holy Willie's Prayer, Address to the Deil, and William Blake's Marriage of Heaven and Hell.

Significance
Due to Merriman's satire of a culture where the practice of Christian morality has collapsed, his parody of the battle of the sexes, and his biting social commentary, Cúirt an Mheán Óiche is a truly unique work in the history of Irish poetry in either language.

Legacy

Literary and cultural legacy
Like much Irish and Scottish Gaelic oral poetry Cúirt an Mheán Oíche was preserved mainly by being memorized by successive generations of local seanchaithe although a manuscript of the poem written by Merriman himself does exist in Cambridge University Library. It was eventually published in 1850, by the Irish language poetry collector John O'Daly. Both before and since its first publication, Merriman's masterpiece has had an enormous literary influence.

In his comic verse drama in Scottish Gaelic, Parlamaid nan Cailleach ("The Parliament of Hags"), Roman Catholic priest Fr. Allan MacDonald (1959–1905) of Eriskay lampoons the gossiping of his female parishioners and the courtship and marriage customs of the Hebrides. Ronald Black, a well known scholar of Scottish Gaelic literature, has compared the play to similar works comic poetry from Irish literature in the Irish language, such as Domhnall Ó Colmáin's 1670 Párliament na mBan ("The Women's Parliament") and Brian Merriman's 1780 Cúirt an Mheán Oíche ("The Midnight Court").

In recent years, Merriman's poem and other Irish and Scottish Gaelic comic poetry have been admired, praised, and emulated by modern Irish poets, including Seamus Heaney and Thomas Kinsella.

Cúirt an Mheán Oíche has been dramatised by Tom MacIntyre and Celia de Fréine and has been turned into a comic opera by composer Ana Sokolović with English libretto by Paul Bentley.

In 2018, Irish dialectologist Brian Ó Curnáin found an 1817 manuscript of Cúirt an Mheán Oíche in the archives of the Royal Irish Academy. The manuscript, which is signed Éamann Ó hOrchaidh, renders the poem not into the Munster Irish spoken by Brian Merriman, but into the now-extinct dialect of Connacht Irish once spoken in County Roscommon. The discovery is regarded as priceless in what it reveals of a now vanished dialect of the Irish language.

Literary translations
In the 20th century, a number of translations were produced. Translators have generally rendered Cúirt an Mheán Óiche into iambic pentameter and heroic couplets. Ciarán Carson, however, chose to closely reproduce Merriman's original dactylic meter, which he found very similar to the 6/8 rhythm of Irish jigs, and heavy use of alliteration.

According to Frank O'Connor, a German translation of Cúirt an Mheán Óiche also exists.

Notable English versions have been made by Anglo-Irish poets Arland Ussher, Edward Pakenham, 6th Earl of Longford, and by the Irish Jewish poet David Marcus. A free verse translation has been made by Thomas Kinsella and a partial rhymed translation by Seamus Heaney. Brendan Behan is believed to have written an unpublished version, since lost.

Frank O'Connor's translation into heroic couplets, which is the most popular, was banned by the Censorship Board of the Irish State in 1945. Soon after, O'Connor's translation was attacked in print and O'Connor replied. O'Connor alleges that the subsequent debate in The Irish Times, "on the banning of my translation... would make a substantial and informing booklet." The debate began when Professor James Hogan of the National University of Ireland claimed to have found, after reading Cúirt an Mheán Óiche in a literary translation into German, that O'Connor had introduced a blasphemous line that wasn't in the original text. O'Connor responded in print that Professor Hogan did not know enough German to read an Irish language poem in the original. O'Connor also wrote that everything in his translation that the Irish State considered to be obscene was also present in Merriman's original poem in Irish. In his book, A Short History of Irish Literature, O'Connor cites the banning of his translation among several other examples of the crippling effect that the wartime censorship imposed by Taoiseach Éamon de Valera was having upon Irish literature.

In a review for The Guardian of Ciarán Carson's 2006 translation of Cúirt an Mheán Óiche, David Wheately wrote, "When it came to translating Merriman's poem, the temptation might have been to put its four-stressed lines into Swiftian octosyllabics, but instead he has opted for the hop, step and jump of an anapestic beat. According to Carson's introduction, however, his real inspiration was the 6/8 rhythm of Irish jigs, which as a fiddler himself Merriman would have known well. ... The alphabet soup of earlier Carson books such as First Language serves him well here with the alliterative riffing of the Gaelic metre (befuddled and boozed in a bibulous Babel)... For all its problems with the censor, Frank O'Connor's version is the drawing room performance; this one's for the shebeen in the wee small hours."

In an article about his own translation of Merriman's poem, Ciaran Carson wrote, "On the morning of New Year's Day 2005 – the year of the 200th anniversary of Merriman's death – I dreamed about Merriman. I was wandering on a dark hillside when I saw a light in the distance. I followed it, and came to a little house. The door was ajar; timidly, I pushed it open. Merriman was sitting by the hearth, wearing a greatcoat. He gestured at me to sit down. I did so, and we conversed. True, he did most of the talking, but I was fully able to follow the flow of his intricate Irish. I cannot remember what was said. When I awoke, I was disappointed to find my Irish restored to its former poverty. But I felt that I had been touched, just a little, by the hand of the Master."

Legacy in County Clare
Cumann Merriman was founded in 1967 to promote the poet's work. They run an annual Merriman Summer School in County Clare each August.

In 2005, the Clare County Library released a CD recording of a local seanchaí reciting Cúirt an Mheán Óiche in the traditional oral manner. Although it has not been made available for purchase, Cumann Merriman has posted excerpts on their website. For added contrast, the same passages are also reproduced from a modern dramatic reading of the poem.

At the end of a 1993 lecture on Merriman's life and work, Seamus Heaney declared, "Perhaps I can convey the ongoing reality of the poem's life more simply by recollecting a Saturday evening last August when I had the privilege of unveiling a memorial to Brian Merriman on the shore of Lough Graney in Co. Clare, where the opening scene of 'The Midnight Court' is set. The memorial is a large stone quarried from a hill overlooking the lake, and the opening lines are carved on it in Irish. The people who attended the ceremony were almost all from the local district, and were eager to point out the exact corner of the nearby field where the poet had run his hedge school, and the spot on the lough shore where he had fallen asleep and had his vision. This was, and is, the first circle where Merriman's poem flourished and continues to flourish. Later that evening, for example, in a marquee a couple of miles down the road, we attended a performance by the Druid Theatre Company from Galway in which the poem was given a dramatic presentation with all the boost and blast-off that song and music and topical allusion could provide. Again, hundreds of local people were in the tent, shouting and taking sides like a football crowd, as the old man and the young woman battled it out and the president of the court gave her judgement. The psychosexual demons were no longer at bay but rampant and fully recognised, so that the audience, at the end of the performance, came away from the experience every bit as accused and absolved as the poet himself at the end of his poem. The 'profane perfection of mankind' was going ahead and civilisation was being kept on course; in a ceremony that was entirely convincing and contemporary, Orpheus has been remembered in Ireland."

See also
Aisling
The Dream of Rhonabwy
Irish poetry
List of Irish poets

References

External links
Cuirt an Mheán Oíche: text and English translation
Cumann Merriman (Bilingual)
Ricorso
Ciaran Carson on Translating "The Midnight Court"

1740s births
1805 deaths
18th-century Irish educators
18th-century Irish-language poets
19th-century Irish educators
Aibell
Celtic mythology in popular culture
Censorship in the Republic of Ireland
Irish satirists
Irish schoolteachers
Mythological cycle
Oral epic poets
Underground education
Works based on Celtic mythology
Writers from County Clare
Writers from Limerick (city)